Raijieli Daveua (born May 30, 1992) is a Fijian rugby sevens player. She was selected as a member of the Fiji women's national rugby sevens team to the 2016 Summer Olympics.

Rugby career 
Daveua also competed for Fiji at the 2020 Summer Olympics in Tokyo. She won a bronze medal at the event.

Daveua won a silver medal with the Fijiana sevens team at the 2022 Commonwealth Games in Birmingham. She also featured at the 2022 Rugby World Cup Sevens in Cape Town.

Daveua was named on the bench in the warm up match against Canada ahead of the World Cup. She was selected for the Fijiana squad to the 2021 Rugby World Cup in New Zealand.

References

External links

 

1992 births
Living people
Rugby sevens players at the 2016 Summer Olympics
Rugby sevens players at the 2020 Summer Olympics
Olympic rugby sevens players of Fiji
Fijian female rugby union players
Medalists at the 2020 Summer Olympics
Olympic bronze medalists for Fiji
Olympic medalists in rugby sevens
Fiji international women's rugby sevens players
Commonwealth Games silver medallists for Fiji
Commonwealth Games medallists in rugby sevens
Rugby sevens players at the 2022 Commonwealth Games
Medallists at the 2022 Commonwealth Games